Ceriagrion chromothorax is a species of damselfly in the family Coenagrionidae. it is commonly known as Sindhudurg marsh dart. This species can be found in South India.

This species is similar to Ceriagrion coromandelianum and Ceriagrion indochinense, but can be distinguished from them by its chrome yellow synthorax, structure of the prothorax, and the shape of caudal appendages. The name chromothorax is given for the bright yellow thoracic coloration. C. chromothorax is a larger species with a slimmer abdomen as compared to C. coromandelianum. Its abdomen is yellowish brown with black markings on the dorsum of last segments.

See also 
 List of odonates of India
 List of odonata of Kerala

References

External links 

Coenagrionidae
Insects described in 2019